Baumhauerite (Pb3As4S9) is a rare lead sulfosalt mineral.  It crystallizes in the triclinic system, is gray-black to blue-gray and its lustre is metallic to dull. Baumhauerite has a hardness of 3.

Baumhauerite occurs as small crystals embedded in dolomitic marble. It is found primarily in the Lengenbach Quarry, Binnental, in the Valais region of Switzerland, the mineral is named after German mineralogist Heinrich Adolph Baumhauer (1848–1926), who discovered it at Lengenbach, famous among mineralogists for its array of rare minerals, in 1902. Baumhauerite has also been reported at Sterling Hill, New Jersey, United States, typically in association with molybdenite, and in aggregates at Hemlo, Thunder Bay, Ontario, Canada.

See also
List of minerals
List of minerals named after people

References

Lead minerals
Arsenic minerals
Sulfosalt minerals
Triclinic minerals
Minerals in space group 1